St. Francis Borgia Regional High School is a Roman Catholic secondary school in Washington, Franklin County, Missouri, established in 1901. As of 2021, its enrollment is 430 students.

History 
St. Francis Borgia High School dates back to 1901 when the school enrolled twenty-three students to further their education past the grade school level. In 1910 the school became a two-year Commercial School and then in 1934 St. Francis Borgia officially became a four-year parish high school. As the school expanded and more students enrolled, a larger campus was needed. It went through four locations before finally settling in 1982 at 1000 Borgia Drive, close to downtown Washington, Missouri.

In 1985 over half of the student body came from outside of the Washington city limits. The growing number of students and more rigorous academic requirements made way for another expansion program which began in 1998. This included thirteen new classrooms, two remodeled science labs, remodeling and enlargement of the theater, chapel, and cafeteria, a weight room, an elevator, additional offices, and restrooms. In 2001 the High school was accredited as a college preparatory high school by the North Central Accrediting Association.

A new AstroTurf football field and a regulation-sized track were added to the facilities in the summer of 2010.  In the 2012–2013 school year, iPad technology was integrated into learning.

In 2015, a new multipurpose building was constructed near the existing gymnasium and connected with a covered walkway. It was named after past school president George Wingbermuehle.

Clubs 
Here is a listing of some of the clubs at Borgia: Scholar Bowl, National Honor Society, Student Council, Art Club, Speech, Soul Singers, and Borgia On Stage Society. Some of the religious groups students can be a part of are Campus Ministry and CLIF (Christ Leaders in Faith). There are also two language clubs, Spanish and German. A complete listing of the club and leadership opportunities can be found on the website.

Academics 
It offers an eight-class block schedule. A student can earn up to 50 college credit hours through East Central College. The class sizes are small, with a school enrollment of 445 students.

Sports 
The school often competes at the state level and has won a total of 18 state titles in 5 different sports. The Starry Knights Dance Team have a total of 8 state titles (2006, 2007, and 2009 through 2014) and the Borgia Knights Cheer Team has 6 state titles (2011, 2013, 2014, 2015, 2016 & 2017).

Notable alumni

Brock Olivo - Class of 1994: University of Missouri, NFL Running back Detroit Lions. Current Head Coach for the Lazio Ducks
Matt Pickens - Class of 2000: an American retired soccer player who is currently the goalkeeping coach for Nashville SC in Major League Soccer
Jack Wagner - Class of 1978: actor

References

External links
 School Website

Roman Catholic Archdiocese of St. Louis
High schools in Franklin County, Missouri
Private schools in Franklin County, Missouri
Roman Catholic secondary schools in Greater St. Louis
Educational institutions established in 1901
1901 establishments in Missouri